Siegfried Köhler  (born 6 October 1935) is a German cyclist. He won the silver medal in team pursuit in the 1960 Summer Olympics.

Early life and family

Siegfried Köhler was born in Forst, Brandenburg, Germany.

References

1935 births
Living people
Sportspeople from Forst (Lausitz)
People from the Province of Brandenburg
German male cyclists
German track cyclists
Olympic cyclists of the United Team of Germany
Cyclists at the 1956 Summer Olympics
Cyclists at the 1960 Summer Olympics
Olympic silver medalists for the United Team of Germany
Olympic medalists in cycling
Medalists at the 1960 Summer Olympics
Recipients of the Patriotic Order of Merit in bronze
People from Bezirk Cottbus
East German male cyclists
Cyclists from Brandenburg